Hyblaea fontainei is a moth in the family Hyblaeidae described by Emilio Berio in 1967.

References

Hyblaeidae